Aguirre may refer to:

Media
Aguirre, the Wrath of God, a 1972 film by Werner Herzog, loosely based on the career of Lope de Aguirre (1510–1561)
 Aguirre (soundtrack), the soundtrack to Herzog's film, composed and performed by Popol Vuh

Places
 Aguirre, Salinas, Puerto Rico, a barrio in the municipality of Salinas, Puerto Rico
 Aguirre Department, Santiago del Estero Province, Argentina
 Aguirre, Venezuela, a village in Carabobo state, Venezuela

Other uses
Aguirre (surname)
 BAP Aguirre, several Peruvian Navy ships commissioned between 1951 and 2005

See also
 Agirre, a surname